Brian Eric Bonsall (born December 3, 1981) is an American rock musician, singer, guitarist and former child actor. He is perhaps best known for his roles as Andrew "Andy" Keaton, the youngest child on the NBC sitcom Family Ties from 1986 until 1989, and Alexander Rozhenko, the son of  Worf and K'ehleyr, on Star Trek: The Next Generation from 1992 to 1994.

Early life and acting career
Bonsall was born in Torrance, California, to Garth Bonsall and his wife Kathleen Coleman. In 1986, he began playing the role of Andy Keaton in the sitcom Family Ties. Bonsall won three Young Artist Awards for his performance on the series. He was also nominated for a Young Artist Award for his starring role in the made-for-TV movie Do You Know the Muffin Man? in 1990. 

He made his feature film debut in 1992 in the horror film Mikey, playing the title role, a demonic young boy who murders his parents and terrorizes his adoptive parents. This caused controversy in the UK owing to its depiction of a child killer at a time when the murder of James Bulger had raised sensitivity about violent behavior by children. The film was initially passed uncut by the British Board of Film Classification, but its certificate was withdrawn by James Ferman in the wake of the Bulger killing.

Bonsall is known for playing Alexander Rozhenko, son of Star Trek: The Next Generations Klingon security officer, Worf—a recurring role he played for seven episodes across several seasons.

He played Patrick Swayze's son in the 1993 film Father Hood. In 1994, he starred in the Disney comedy Blank Check and co-starred with Bob Saget in the TV movie comedy Father and Scout. His other acting credits include the TV movie Mother Goose Rock 'n' Rhyme and guest appearances on television series such as The Super Mario Bros. Super Show! and The Young Riders.

Post-acting
In 1995, Bonsall retired from acting and moved with his mother and stepfather to Boulder, Colorado. He attended Boulder High School, graduating in 2000. 

He became a musician, forming the rock band Late Bloomers with his friends in 1998. He has been in the Boulder-based punk bands Thruster and The Light on Adam's Stereo.

In 2016, Bonsall toured with rock band The Ataris. That same year, he claimed to have been clean and sober since his 2010 arrest: "My drunken run-ins with the law are about 10 years behind me, so I’m pretty happy about that. I’m not proud of my past mistakes but you live and you learn".

In October 2017, Bonsall married Courtney Tuck. Their son, Oliver, was born in August of 2019. Bonsall is currently a member of the band Sunset Silhouette.

Legal issues
On March 28, 2007, Bonsall was arrested on charges of assaulting his girlfriend. He was sentenced to two years of probation on August 31, 2007. 

On December 7, 2009, Bonsall was arrested for third-degree assault and failure-to-appear in connection with the 2007 assault on his girlfriend.

In February, 2010, Bonsall was arrested on charges of using marijuana in violation of the terms of his release. He was sentenced in April 2010 to two years of probation.

Filmography

Awards and nominations

References

External links 

Brian Bonsall on SoundCloud

1981 births
American male child actors
American male film actors
American male television actors
Boulder High School alumni
Living people
Male actors from Greater Los Angeles
People with bipolar disorder
The Ataris members
American punk rock musicians